Rhyno Herbst (born ) is a South African rugby union player for the Seattle Seawolves of Major League Rugby (MLR).

His regular position is lock.

References

External links
itsrugby.co.uk profile

Alumni of Monument High School
South African rugby union players
Living people
1996 births
People from Roodepoort
Rugby union locks
Golden Lions players
Rugby union players from Gauteng
Lions (United Rugby Championship) players
Seattle Seawolves players